Kanivenarayanapura is a village located 6 km from Chikballapur, 3 km from Nandi Town and 2 km from Muddenahalli in Chikballapur District of Karnataka State.

Transportation
Kanivenaryanapura can be reached by bus, it is 50 km from Bangalore via Yelahanka and Devanahalli.

References

Cities and towns in Chikkaballapur district